Shoreline South/148th station is a planned elevated station on Sound Transit's Lynnwood Link Extension, part of the Link light rail system. It will be located at the intersection of Interstate 5 and State Route 523 (NE 145th Street) in Shoreline and will open in 2024 with the rest of the line.

The interchange is currently home to a flyer stop used by King County Metro and Sound Transit Express routes.

Location

Shoreline South/148th station will be located adjacent to Interstate 5 at State Route 523 (NE 145th Street), which is situated between the cities of Seattle and Shoreline. The elevated station will be in the northeast corner of the interchange, attached to a 500-stall parking garage with access from 5th Avenue NE.

A pedestrian bridge over I-5 at Northeast 148th Street is planned to be constructed by the City of Shoreline.

History

The Northeast 145th Street flyer stop was built by Metro Transit in 1979, with thru ramps for both northbound and southbound buses. An additional set of ramps allows buses entering and exiting I-5 via SR 523 to serve the flyer stops.

In October 2020, the Sound Transit Board approved renaming the station from Shoreline South/145th to Shoreline South/148th per a request from the Shoreline government to better reflect the revised location of the station.

References

External links
Lynnwood Link Extension

Future Link light rail stations
Link light rail stations in King County, Washington
Shoreline, Washington
Railway stations scheduled to open in 2024